Gauldal or Gauldalen is a valley and traditional district in Trøndelag county, Norway. The narrow valley runs northwards from Røros to the Haltdalen area, where it widens some, turns and heads generally to the west to the village of Støren. At Støren it turns again and heads north through what is now a wide, agricultural valley until it reaches the sea just south of the city of Trondheim. The Rørosbanen and Dovrebanen railway lines follow the Gauldalen valley on their way to Trondheim. The European route E6 highway and the Norwegian County Road 30 also follow the valley.

The traditional district of Gauldal includes the municipalities of Holtålen, Midtre Gauldal, and Melhus. The municipality of Røros is often (traditionally) counted as a part of the district, even though it lies outside the actual Gaula river valley.

History

In September 1345, there was a landslide just north of the village of Støren. This newly formed lake flooded and destroyed 25 upstream farms in the narrow valley. The vast amount of water building up behind the earthen dam from the landslide did not hold long and, when it burst, the water rushed though the dam and caused a major flood downstream, killing about 500 people and destroying another 25 farms as well as several churches. The downstream flash flood continued to just past the village of Melhus, not far from the mouth of the river Gaula. This was one of the worst natural disasters ever in Norway.

Media gallery

References

Districts of Trøndelag
Holtålen
Midtre Gauldal
Melhus
Røros
Valleys of Trøndelag